The Supreme Court of Yukon (SCY) is the superior court having general jurisdiction for the Canadian territory of Yukon. Civil and criminal cases are heard by the court, as well as appeals from the Yukon Territorial Court, the Yukon Small Claims Court and other quasi-judicial boards. The court is based in Whitehorse. Appeals from the court are made to the Court of Appeal of Yukon.

The current Chief Justice of the Supreme Court of Yukon is Suzanne Duncan.

Justices
The SCY consists of three resident judges, five judges from the Northwest Territories and Nunavut, and forty-two deputy judges appointed from across Canada. The rules of procedure for the SCY are based upon those of the Supreme Court of British Columbia.

Justices of the SCY are also ex officio members of the Court of Appeal of Yukon, Court of Appeal for the Northwest Territories, and Nunavut Court of Appeal.

Notable decisions
 Dunbar & Edge v. Yukon (Government of) & Canada (A.G.)

References

External links

Yukon
Yukon courts